was a railway station located in Wajima, Ishikawa Prefecture, Japan. This station was abandoned in 2001.

Line
 Noto Railway
 Nanao Line

Adjacent stations

External links 
 Noto-Ichinose Station page at notor.info

 

Railway stations in Ishikawa Prefecture
Defunct railway stations in Japan